New Lucena, officially the Municipality of New Lucena,  is a 4th class municipality in the province of Iloilo, Philippines. According to the 2020 census, it has a population of 24,314 people.

The "New" in the name was added in 1955.

History
Municipality of New Lucena was formerly known as Jimanban, a very small barrio organized sometime in 1800, which was a part of the Municipality of Cabatuan. In 1886 the boundary line separating the jurisdiction of Santa Barbara and Cabatuan was defined and Jimanban was made part of Santa Barbara. Intermarriage among the people increased the area's population

Led by Bartolome Valenzuela, a prominent resident of the barrio (Jimanban) the resident organized themselves and petitioned the governor general that they be granted independence by putting up a church, convent and a casa real (municipal building). With the help of the provincial officials and captain municipal of the municipalities of Santa Barbara, Cabatuan and Pototan, Lucena was separated from Santa Barbara on October 9, 1877, in accordance with the Dirrecion General De Administration Civil. The first Municipal Officials were elected and the first captain municipal was Bartolome Valenzuela known as Tan Abe, the grandfather of then Senator Tomas Confessor and Representative Patricio Confessor.

It is not recorded when Jimanban was changed to New Lucena but Lucena reportedly comes from dialect Lu (Ulo) which means "head"and "cena" which is the short version for the flower azucena, which means pure and peaceful. Thus, Lucena means pure and peaceful leader.

Another belief was that, Jimanban was changed to Lucena after the name of the Provincial Alcalde Mayor Pedro Gonzales Lucena, the 36th Executive of the Province of Iloilo in 1716–1717.

When the Americans came, Pueblo de Lucena was again in incorporated to the Municipal of Santa Barbara in 1902 for economic security and facilitation of government. In 1921, the prominent cicitizens of Lucena petitioned for its separation from Santa Barbara. On January 1, 1947, Lucena became a new town in the Province of Iloilo, thus it is now called New Lucena.

Geography
New Lucena is located in the central portion of the Province of Iloilo.

The town proper of New Lucena could be traversed by land either way via Dawis-Zarraga or via Santa Barbara. New Lucena is crisscrossed by the roads from the north to south and east to west thus providing roads for easy means of transportation.

Soil
The soil classification map of New Lucena reflects two types of soil, namely the Alimodian Clay Loam and the Santa Rita Clay Loam.
The Alimodian Clay Loam is found in barangay Janipa-an Oeste and Badiang, also occupying the larger portion of barangay Jelicuon Oeste, Cabugao, Wari-wari, Cabilauan and Guinobatan; then in the small portion of Barangay Bololacao, Bilidan and Bita-og Gaja
 
The Santa Rita Clay Loam covers the Barangay Cagban, Burot, General Delgado, Baclayan, Poblacion, Dawis, Balabag, Damires, Calumbuyan, Jelicuon Este and Pasil; also occupying the larger parts of Bita-og gaja, Bilidan and Bololacao; then occupying a smaller portion of Barangay Wari-wari, Cabugao and Guinobatan. 
Its corresponding type, areas coverage and percentage from the total land area are as follows: The Alimodian Clay Loam covers an area of 1525 hectares is 34.56% of the total land area. The Santa Rita Clay Loam covers an area of 2887 and 65.44% of the total land area.

Slope
The degree of inclination of the municipality ranges from 0 to 15%. It is best described as broad to level land so moderately undulating and gently rolling land sloping in more than one direction.
The slope category A with 0-3% best described as broad to level nearly level, has a total land coverage area of 1475 hectares representing 33.43% of the total land area; 3-5 percent slope or slope category B covers an area of 1762 hectares or 39.94% of the total land area.
The 5-8% slope or category C has a total area coverage of 1050 hectares or 23.80% of the total land area. And the 8-15% slope representing the smallest figure of 125 hectares is 2.83% of the total land area.

Climate

New Lucena partly belongs to the first district climate region in the province that is the region dry from December to June and wet from July to November. The average monthly rainfall for 1984 is 263.48 cu.m. and an average humidity of 79.83%

Barangays
New Lucena is politically subdivided into 21 barangays.

Demographics

Economy

See also
List of renamed cities and municipalities of the Philippines

References

External links

 [ Philippine Standard Geographic Code]
 Philippine Census Information
 Local Governance Performance Management System

Municipalities of Iloilo